Frederick Mason (4 February 1881 – 11 May 1936) was a New Zealand cricketer. He played 17 first-class matches for Auckland between 1902 and 1915, and represented New Zealand twice in 1904–05.

See also
 List of Auckland representative cricketers

References

External links
 

1881 births
1936 deaths
New Zealand cricketers
Pre-1930 New Zealand representative cricketers
Auckland cricketers
Cricketers from Napier, New Zealand
North Island cricketers